Cosmos sherffii is a Mexican species of plants in the family Asteraceae. It has been found only in the state of Oaxaca in southern Mexico.

Cosmos sherffii is a branching perennial up to 80 cm (32 inches) tall, producing thick, tuberous roots underground. Leaves are highly divided into many small lobes and leaflets. Each stem usually produces only one flower head, with rose-colored ray florets and yellow disc florets.

References

External links

sherffii
Plants described in 1967
Flora of Oaxaca